Another Midnight Run is a 1994 American made-for-television film, and the first in a series of television films produced for Universal Television's Action Pack programming block and based on the 1988 feature film Midnight Run. Christopher McDonald plays bounty hunter Jack Walsh, who was portrayed by Robert De Niro in the first film. Another Midnight Run was followed by two more made-for-television sequels, Midnight Runaround and Midnight Run for Your Life.

Plot summary 
Jack Walsh (McDonald) is hired by bail bondsman Eddie Moscone (Dan Hedaya) to bring in Bernie Abbot (Jeffrey Tambor) and Helen Bishop (Cathy Moriarty), a husband and wife team of con artists. Moscone also brings in rival bounty hunter Marvin Dorfler (Ed O'Ross) to work with Jack, with the agreement that they will split the money; however, both men are planning to double cross each other.

Cast and characters 
 Christopher McDonald as Jack Walsh
 Jeffrey Tambor as Bernie Abbot
 Cathy Moriarty as Helen Bishop
 Ed O'Ross as Marvin Dorfler
 John Fleck as Jerry Geisler
 Dan Hedaya as Eddie Moscone
 Sam Shamshak as Lester Weems

Alternate titles 
Midnight Run 2: Another Midnight Run (UK)
Midnight Run: Cash Comes at Midnight (Germany)

References

External links 

American action comedy films
American television films
Action Pack (TV programming block)
Universal Pictures films
1994 television films
1994 films
Television sequel films
Films set in Los Angeles
Films directed by James Frawley
1990s English-language films
1990s American films